Jamāl al-Dīn Abū al-Ḥajjāj Yūsuf ibn al-Zakī ʻAbd al-Raḥmān ibn Yūsuf ibn ʻAbd al-Malik ibn Yūsuf al-Kalbī al-Quḍā’ī al-Mizzī,, also called Al-Ḥāfiẓ Abī al-Ḥajjāj, was a Syrian muhaddith  and the foremost `Ilm al-rijāl Islamic scholar.

Life
Al-Mizzī was born near Aleppo in 1256  under the reign of the last Ayyubid emir An-Nasir Yusuf. From 1260 the region  was ruled by the na'ib al-saltana (viceroys) of the Mamluk Sultanate.   In childhood he moved with his family to the village of al-Mizza outside Damascus, where he was educated in Qur’ān and fiqh. 
In his twenties he began his studies to become a muḥaddith and learned from the masters.  His fellow pupil and life-long friend was Taqī al-Dīn ibn Taymiyya. It was also Taymiyya’s ideological influence, which although contrary to his own Shāfi’ī legalist inclination, that led to a stint in jail. 

Despite his affiliation with Ibn Taymiyya he became head of the Dār al-Ḥadīth al-Ashrafiyya, a leading ḥadīth academy in Damascus, in 1319.  And although he professed the Ash’arī doctrine suspicion continued about his true beliefs.  He travelled across the Mamluk Sultanate of Egypt, Syria, and Ḥijāz and became the greatest `Ilm al-rijāl scholar of the Muslim world and an expert grammarian and philologist of Arabic. He died at Dar al-Hadith al-Ashrafiyyah in Damascus in 1341/2 and was buried in the Sufiyyah graveyard.

Pupils

Al-Dhahabī
‘Abd al-Wahhab al-Subkī
Ismā‘īl ibn Kathīr  Ibn Kathir married a daughter of al-Mizzī.
 Ibn al-Furat
 Najm ad-Din al-Tufi

Works
Tahdhīb al-kamāl fī asmā’ al-rijāl; biographical lexicon and comprehensive reworking of Al-Kamal fi Asma' al-Rijal, a collection of narrator biographies  of the transmitters of isnāds in the Six major Hadith collections and others, based upon the tarf (beginning segment) of the hadith. The Tahdhīb includes Ruwāt kuttub al-sitta. Al-Asqalānī and others wrote compendia of this work.
Tuḥfat al-ashraf bi-Ma’rifat al-Aṭraf; alphabetically indexed encyclopaedia of the musnads of the first generation transmitters, the Companions of the Prophet. An indespensible resource for the study of Muslim tradition that comprises al-Nasā’ī's Al-Sunan al-kubrā.

References

Bibliography

1256 births
1342 deaths
13th-century Arabs
14th-century Arabs
Sunni Muslim scholars of Islam
Shafi'is
Atharis
Hadith scholars
People from Damascus
14th-century Muslim scholars of Islam
Proto-Salafists
13th-century jurists
14th-century jurists
Biographical evaluation scholars
Banu Kalb